Manipur is a state in Northeast India, with the city of Imphal as its capital. It is bounded by the Indian states of Nagaland to the north, Mizoram to the south and Assam to the west. It also borders two regions of Myanmar, Sagaing Region to the east and Chin State to the south. The official and most widely spoken language is Meitei language (officially known as Manipuri language). Native to the Meitei people, it is also used as a lingua franca by smaller communities, who speak a variety of other Sino-Tibetan languages. Manipur has been at the crossroads of Asian economic and cultural exchange for more than 2,500 years. It connects the Indian subcontinent and Central Asia to Southeast Asia, East Asia, Siberia, regions in the Arctic, Micronesia and Polynesia enabling migration of people, cultures and religions.

During the days of the British Indian Empire, the Kingdom of Manipur was one of the princely states. Between 1917 and 1939, some people of Manipur pressed the princely rulers for democracy. By the late 1930s, the princely state of Manipur negotiated with the British administration its preference to continue to be part of the Indian Empire, rather than part of Burma, which was being separated from India. These negotiations were cut short with the outbreak of World War II in 1939. On 11 August 1947, Maharaja Budhachandra signed an Instrument of Accession, joining India. Later, on 21 September 1949, he signed a Merger Agreement, merging the kingdom into India, which led to its becoming a Part C State. This merger was later disputed by groups in Manipur, as having been completed without consensus and under duress. The dispute and differing visions for the future has resulted in a 50-year insurgency in the state for independence from India, as well as in repeated episodes of violence among ethnic groups in the state. From 2009 through 2018, the conflict was responsible for the violent deaths of over 1000 people.

The Meitei people represent around 53% of the population of Manipur state, followed by various Naga ethnic groups at 24% and various Kuki/Zomi tribes (also known as Chin-Kuki-Mizo people) at 16%. Manipur's ethnic groups practice a variety of religions. According to 2011 census, Hinduism is the major religion in the state, closely followed by Christianity. Other religions include Islam, Sanamahism, Buddhism, and Judaism, etc.

Manipur has primarily an agrarian economy, with significant hydroelectric power generation potential. It is connected to other areas by daily flights through Imphal airport, the second largest in northeastern India. Manipur is home to many sports and the origin of Manipuri dance, and is credited with introducing polo to Europeans.

Alternate names
The word "Manipur" is made-up of two Sanskrit words (Maṇi), which means jewel and (Purǝ), which means land/place/abode, Manipur is translated as "Jewelled land".
Manipur is mentioned in historic texts as Kangleipak or Meeteileipak. Sanamahi Laikan wrote that officials during the reign of Meidingu Pamheiba in the eighteenth century adopted Manipur's new name.

Neighbouring cultures each had differing names for Manipur and its people. The Shan or Pong called the area Cassay, the Burmese Kathe, and the Assamese Meklee. In the first treaty between the British East India Company and Meidingu Chingthangkhomba (Bhagyachandra), signed in 1762, the kingdom was referred to as “Meckley”. Bhagyachandra and his successors issued coins engraved with "Manipureshwar", or "lord of Manipur", and the British discarded the name Meckley. Later on, the work Dharani Samhita (1825–34) popularised the Sanskrit legends of the origin of Manipur's name.

The term Kanglei, meaning "of Manipur/Kangleipak", is used to refer to items associated with the state where the term Manipuri is a recently given name.

History

Antiquity 

The history of Manipur Meities is chronicled in Puyas or Puwaris (stories about the forefathers), namely, the Ninghthou Kangbalon, Cheitharol Kumbaba, Ningthourol Lambuba, Poireiton Khunthokpa, Panthoibi Khongkul, and so forth in the archaic Meitei script, which is comparable to the Thai script. Hill tribes have their own folk tales, myths, and legends. Manipur was known by different names at various periods in its history, such as, Tilli-Koktong, Poirei-Lam, Sanna-Leipak, Mitei-Leipak, Meitrabak or Manipur (present day). Its capital was Kangla, Yumphal or Imphal (present day). Its people were known by various names, such as Mi-tei, Poirei-Mitei, Meetei, Maitei or Meitei. The Puwaris, Ninghthou Kangbalon, Ningthourol Lambuba, Cheitharol Kumbaba, Poireiton Khunthokpa, recorded the events of each King who ruled Manipur in a span of more than 3500 years until 1955 CE (a total of more than 108 kings). According to some Tai chronicles, Manipur (Kahse) is one of the territories conquered by Samlongpha, the first Sawbwa of Mongkawng. A 14th century inscription from Pagan mentions Kasan (Manipur) to be one of the 21 states under Mong Mao ruler Thonganbwa (1413–1445/6)	who was later captured by the Governor of Taungdwingyi. Ningthou Kangba (15th century BCE) is regarded as the first and foremost king of Manipur. There were times when the country was in turmoil without rulers, and long historical gaps exist between 1129 BCE and 44 BCE. In 1891 CE, after the defeat of the Meiteis by the British in the Anglo-Manipuri war of Khongjom, the sovereignty of Manipur which it had maintained for more than three millenniums, was lost. In 1926, it became a part of Pakokku Hill Tracts Districts of British Burma until 4 January 1947. It regained its freedom on 14 August 1947. On 15 October 1949, Manipur was unified with India.

Medieval

By the medieval period, marriage alliances between the royal families of Manipur,  Ahom kingdom and Burma had become common. Medieval era manuscripts discovered in the 20th century, particularly the Puya, provide evidence that Hindus from the Indian subcontinent had married Manipur royalty by at least the 14th century. In centuries thereafter, royal spouses came also from what is now Assam, Bengal, and Uttar Pradesh and from other South Indian kingdoms as well. Another manuscript suggests that Muslims arrived in Manipur in the 17th century, from what is now Bangladesh, during the reign of Meidingu Khagemba. The socio-political turmoil and wars, particularly the persistent and devastating Anglo-Burmese wars, affected the cultural and religious demography of Manipur.

Imperial period

In 1824, the ruler of Manipur entered into a subsidiary alliance with the British Empire in the Indian subcontinent, which became responsible for Manipur's external defence. The British recognised that the state remained internally self-governing, as a princely state. During World War II, Manipur was the scene of many fierce battles between Japanese invaders and British Indian forces. The Japanese were beaten back before they could enter Imphal, which was one of the turning points of the overall war in South Asia.

Modern history

After the war, British India moved towards independence, and the princely states which had existed alongside it became responsible for their own external affairs and defence, unless they joined the new India or the new Pakistan. The Manipur State Constitution Act of 1947 established a democratic form of government, with the Maharaja continuing as the head of state. Maharaja Bodhchandra was summoned to Shillong, to merge the kingdom into the Union of India. He is believed to have signed the merger agreement under duress. Thereafter, the legislative assembly was dissolved, and in October 1949 Manipur became part of India. It was made a Union Territory in 1956. and a fully-fledged State in 1972 by the North-Eastern Areas (Reorganisation) Act, 1971.

Manipur had a long record of insurgency and inter-ethnic violence. The first armed opposition group in Manipur, the United National Liberation Front (UNLF), was founded in 1964 and declared that it wanted to gain independence from India and form Manipur as a new country. Over time, many more groups formed in Manipur, each with different goals, and deriving support from diverse ethnic groups in Manipur. In 1977 the People's Revolutionary Party of Kangleipak (PREPAK) was formed, and the People's Liberation Army (PLA), formed in 1978 which Human Rights Watch said had received arms and training from China. In 1980, the Kangleipak Communist Party (KCP) was formed. These groups began a spree of bank robberies and attacks on police officers and government buildings. The state government appealed to the central government in New Delhi for support in combating this violence.

From 1980 to 2004, the Indian government referred to Manipur as a disturbed area. This term (designated by the Ministry of Home Affairs or a state governor) refers to a territory where extraordinary laws under the Armed Forces (Special Powers) Act can be used. The laws allow the military to treat private and public spaces, in the same manner, detain individuals up to 24 hours with unlimited renewals, to perform warrantless searches, and to shoot and kill individuals that break laws, carry weapons, or gather in groups larger than four as well as giving legal immunity to the military. Since 1980, the application of AFSPA has been at the heart of concerns about human rights violations in the region, such as arbitrary killings, torture, cruel, inhuman and degrading treatment, and forced disappearances. Its continued application has led to numerous protests, notably the longstanding hunger strike by Irom Sharmila Chanu.

In 2004, the government lifted the disturbed status after a violent attack on a local woman. The rape of a manipuri woman, Thangjam Manorama Devi, by members of the Assam Rifles paramilitary had led to wide protests including a nude protest by the Meira Paibis women association.

Geography

The slope of the valley is from north to south. The mountain ranges create a moderated climate, preventing the cold winds from the north from reaching the valley and barring cyclonic storms.

The state is bordered by the Indian states of Nagaland to its north, Mizoram to its south, Assam to its west, and shares an international border with Myanmar to its east.

The state has four major river basins: the Barak River Basin (Barak Valley) to the west, the Manipur River Basin in central Manipur, the Yu River Basin in the east, and a portion of the Lanye River Basin in the north. The water resources of Barak and Manipur river basins are about 1.8487 Mham (million hectare metres). The overall water balance of the state amounts to 0.7236 Mham in the annual water budget. (By comparison, India receives 400 Mham of rain annually.)

The Barak River, the largest of Manipur, originates in the Manipur Hills and is joined by tributaries, such as the Irang, Maku, and Tuivai. After its junction with the Tuivai, the Barak River turns north, forms the border with Assam State, and then enters the Cachar Assam just above Lakhipur. The Manipur river basin has eight major rivers: the Manipur, Imphal, Iril, Nambul, Sekmai, Chakpi, Thoubal and Khuga. All these rivers originate from the surrounding hills.

Almost all the rivers in the valley area are in the mature stage and therefore deposit their sediment load in the Loktak lake. The rivers draining the Manipur Hills are comparatively young, due to the hilly terrain through which they flow. These rivers are corrosive and become turbulent in the rainy season. Important rivers draining the western area include the Maku, Barak, Jiri, Irang, and Leimatak. Rivers draining the eastern part of the state, the Yu River Basin, include the Chamu, Khunou and other short streams.

Manipur may be characterised as two distinct physical regions: an outlying area of rugged hills and narrow valleys, and the inner area of flat plain, with all associated landforms. These two areas are distinct in physical features and are conspicuous in flora and fauna. The valley region has hills and mounds rising above the flat surface. The Loktak lake is an important feature of the central plain. The total area occupied by all the lakes is about 600 km2. The altitude ranges from 40 m at Jiribam to 2,994 m at Mount Tempü peak along the border with Nagaland.

The soil cover can be divided into two broad types, viz. the red ferruginous soil in the hill area and the alluvium in the valley. The valley soils generally contain loam, small rock fragments, sand, and sandy clay, and are varied. On the plains, especially flood plains and deltas, the soil is quite thick. The topsoil on the steep slopes is very thin. Soil on the steep hill slopes is subject to high erosion, resulting in gullies and barren rock slopes. The normal pH value ranges from 5.4 to 6.8.

Flora

Broadly, there are four types of forests: Tropical Semi-evergreen, Dry Temperate Forest, Sub-Tropical Pine, and Tropical Moist Deciduous.

There are forests of teak, pine, oak, uningthou, leihao, bamboo, and cane. Rubber, tea, coffee, orange, and cardamom are grown in hill areas. Rice is a staple food for Manipuris.

Climate

Manipur's climate is largely influenced by the topography of the region. Lying 790 metres above sea level, Manipur is wedged among hills on all sides. This northeastern corner of India enjoys a generally amiable climate, though the winters can be chilly. The coldest month is January, and the warmest July.

Precipitation ranges from light drizzle to heavy downpour. Rainfall in this region is caused by The South Westerly Monsoon picking up moisture from the Bay of Bengal and heading towards the Eastern Himalaya ranges. This normal rainfall pattern of Manipur enriches the soil and much of the agrarian activities are dependent on it as well.

Manipur is already experiencing climate change, especially changes in weather, with both increased variability in rain as well as increasingly severe changes in temperature.

Demographics

Population 

Manipur has a population of 2,855,794 as per 2011 census. Of this total, 57.2% live in the valley districts and the remaining 42.8% in the hill districts. The valley (plain) is mainly inhabited by the Meitei speaking population (native Manipuri speakers). The hills are inhabited mainly by several ethno-linguistically diverse tribes belonging to the Nagas, the Kukis and smaller tribal groupings. Naga and Kuki settlements are also found in the valley region, though less in numbers. There are also sizable population of Nepalis, Bengalis, Tamils and Marwaris living in Manipur.

The distribution of area, population and density, and literacy rate as per the 2001 Census provisional figures are as below:

People 

The Meiteis (synonymous to the Manipuris) constitute the majority of the state's population. In 1901, the Meiteis were recorded as the main ethnicity of Manipur.

Nagas and Kuki/Zo are the major tribe conglomerates. The Nagas in Manipur are further sub-divided into sub-tribes like Anāl, Liangmai, Mao, Maram, Maring, Poumai, Rongmei, Tangkhul, Zeme, etc.

Languages 

The official language of the state is Meitei (also known as Manipuri). It is a scheduled language in the Republic of India, and serves as the lingua franca in Manipur.

Other than Meitei language, in Manipur, there is a huge amount of linguistic diversity, as is the case in most of the Northeast India. Almost all of the languages are Sino-Tibetan, with many different subgroups represented. There are multiple Kuki-Chin languages, the largest being Thadou. Another major language family is the Naga languages, like Tangkhul, Poula, Rongmei and Mao. Less than 5% speak Indo-European languages, mostly Nepali and Bengali, in its Sylheti dialect, which is the major language of Jiribam district.

The Directorate of Language Planning and Implementation (AKA Department of Language Planning and Implementation) of the Government of Manipur works for the development and the promotion of Meitei language and other local vernaculars of Manipur.

Linguistic events 
 Meitei language day (Manipuri language day) 
 Meitei poetry day (Manipuri poetry day) 
 Meitei language movements
 Meitei classical language movement (ongoing) 
 Meitei linguistic purism movement (ongoing) 
 Meitei scheduled language movement (successful)

Religion 
The religious groups of the Meitei-speaking people include Sanamahists, Hindus, Meitei Christians and Meitei Pangals. Besides these, the non Meitei-speaking communities (tribesmen communities) are mostly Christians.

Hinduism 

The Meitei ethnicity (aka Manipuri people) is the majority group following Hinduism in Manipur, beside other minor immigrants following the same faith in the state. Among the indigenous communities of Manipur, Meiteis are the only Hindus as no other indigenous ethnic groups follow this faith. 
According to the 2011 Census of India, about 41.39% of the Manipuri people practice Hinduism. The Hindu population is heavily concentrated in the Meitei dominant areas of the Manipur Valley (Imphal Valley), among the Meitei people. The districts of Bishnupur, Thoubal, Imphal East, and Imphal West all have Hindu majorities, averaging 67.62% (range 62.27–74.81%) according to the 2011 census data.

Vaishnavite Hinduism was the state religion of the Kingdom of Manipur. In 1704, Meitei King Charairongba accepted Vaishnavism and changed his traditional Meitei name into Hindu name, Pitambar Singh. However, the first Hindu temples were constructed much earlier. A copper plate excavated from Phayeng dating back to 763 CE (believed to be of the reign of Meitei King Khongtekcha) was found to contain inscriptions about the Hindu deities in Sanskrit words. During the 13th century, Meitei King Khumomba constructed a Lord Hanuman temple. The Vishnu temple at Lamangdong was constructed during 1474 CE (during the reign of Meitei King Kiyamba), by Brahmins immigrating from the neighborhood Shan State. As per the legends, the temple was constructed to house the Vishnu emblem given to King Kiyamba by King Khekhomba of Shan. Phurailatpam Shubhi Narayan was the first Brahmin priest of this temple.

Christianity

Christianity is the religion of 41% of the people in the state, but is the majority in rural areas with 53%, and is predominant in the hills. It was brought by Protestant missionaries to Manipur in the 19th century. In the 20th century, a few Christian schools were established, which introduced Western-type education. Christianity is the predominant religion among tribals of Manipur and tribal Christians make up the vast majority (over 96%) of the Christian population in Manipur.

Islam 

The Meitei Pangals, also known as the Meitei Muslims or the Manipuri Muslims, are the third largest religious majority group in the state as they constitute about 8.3% of the state population as per 2011 census. They belong to the Sunni group of the Hanafi school of Islamic thought and there are Arab, Bangladesh, Turani, Bengali and Mughal or Chaghtai Turk sections among these Meitei speaking Muslims.

Sanamahism 

Sanamahism (often referred to as traditional Meitei religion) is the ancient polytheistic indigenous animistic ethnic religion of the Meitei people, the predominant ethnic group of Manipur. Sanamahist worship concentrates on the household deity Lainingthou Sanamahi (often associated as well as confused with direct Sun God Korouhanba). The ancient Meiteis worshiped a Supreme deity, Salailen, and followed their ancestors. Their ancestor worship and animism was based on Umang Lai – ethnic governing deities worshiped in the sacred groves. Some of the traditional Meitei deities (Lais) are Atiya Sidaba, Pakhangba, Sanamahi, Leimaren, Panthoibi, Imoinu, Thangching (Thangjing), Marjing, Wangpulen (Wangbaren) and Koupalu (Koubru). Out of the 233,767 people who opted for the "Other religion" option, 222,315 were Sanamahists.

Other religions 
The various other religions were mostly followers of tribal folk religions, 6,444 were Heraka, 2,032 were Jewish and 1,180 were from other tribal religions such as Tingkao Ragwang Chapriak.

Government

The government of Manipur is a collective assembly of 60 elected members, of which 19 are reserved for Scheduled Tribes and 1 for Scheduled Castes. The state sends two representatives to the Lok Sabha of the Parliament of India. The state sends one representative to the Rajya Sabha. The legislature of the state is Unicameral. Representatives are elected for a five-year term to the state assembly and the Indian parliament through voting, a process overseen by the offices of the Election Commission of India.

The state has one autonomous council.

Civil unrest

Social movements 
There were many public movements in Manipur against the government:
 Meitei classical language movement
 Meitei scheduled language movement
 Meitei linguistic purism movement

Security and insurgency

The violence in Manipur extends beyond the conflict between Indian security forces and insurgent armed groups. There is violence between the Meitei ethnicity, various Naga tribes, various Kuki tribes, and other tribal groups. 

Splinter groups have arisen within some of the armed groups, and disagreement between them is rife. Other than the UNLF, PLA, and PREPAK, Manipuri insurgent groups include the Revolutionary Peoples Front (RPF), Manipur Liberation Front Army (MLFA), Kanglei Yawol Kanba Lup (KYKL), Revolutionary Joint Committee (RJC), Kangleipak Communist Party (KCP), Peoples United Liberation Front (PULF), Manipur Naga People Front (MNPF), National Socialist Council of Nagaland (NSCN-K), National Socialist Council of Nagaland (NSCN-I/M), United Kuki Liberation Front (UKLF), Kuki National Front (KNF), Kuki National Army (KNA), Kuki Defence Force (KDF), Kuki Democratic Movement (KDM), Kuki National Organisation (KNO), Kuki Security Force (KSF), Chin Kuki Revolutionary Front (CKRF), Kom Rem Peoples Convention (KRPC), Zomi Revolutionary Volunteers (ZRV), Zomi Revolutionary Army (ZRA), Zomi Reunification Organisation (ZRO), and Hmar Peoples Convention (HPC).

The Meitei insurgent groups seek independence from India. The Kuki insurgent groups want a separate state for the Kukis to be carved out from the present state of Manipur. The Kuki insurgent groups are under two umbrella organisations: the Kuki National Organisation (KNO) and United Peoples Forum. The Nagas wish to annex part of Manipur and merge with a greater Nagaland or Nagalim, which is in conflict with Meitei insurgent demands for the integrity of their vision of an independent state. There have been many tensions between the tribes and numerous clashes between Naga and Kukis, Meiteis and Muslims.

According to SATP, there has been a dramatic decline in fatalities in Manipur since 2009. In 2009, 77 civilians died (about 3 per 100,000 people). From 2010 onward, about 25 civilians have died in militant-related violence (about 1 per 100,000 people), dropping further to 21 civilian deaths in 2013 (or 0.8 per 100,000 people). However, there were 76 explosions in 2013 compared to 107 in 2012. Different groups have claimed responsibility for the explosions, some claiming they were targeting competing militant groups, others claiming their targets were state and central government officials. 
As a point of comparison, the average annual global rate of violent death between 2004 and 2009 was 7.9 per 100,000 people.

The CM Biren Singh used the National Security Act on a journalist who criticized him by calling him as 'puppet'. NSA is meant to be used when there is grave danger to society not to stifle dissent. These acts further cement isolation and insurgency among locals.

Economy

Its economy is primarily agriculture, forestry, cottage and trade driven. Manipur acts as India's "Gateway to the East" through Moreh and Tamu towns, the land route for trade between India and Burma and other countries in Southeast Asia, East Asia, Siberia, the Arctic, Micronesia and Polynesia. Manipur has the highest number of handicraft units and the highest number of craftspersons in the northeastern region of India.

Electricity
As of 2010, if half of this potential is realised, it is estimated that this would supply 24/7 electricity to all residents, with a surplus for sale, as well as supplying the Burma power grid.

Agriculture
Manipur's climate and soil conditions make it ideally suited for horticultural crops. Growing there are rare and exotic medicinal and aromatic plants. Some cash crops suited for Manipur include Lychee, Cashew, Walnut, Orange, Lemon, Pineapple, Papaya, Passion Fruit, Peach, Pear and Plum.

The agriculture in Manipur includes a number of smallholding farms, many of whom are women. Climate change, especially changes in temperature and weather are hurting small farmers in the state. Like rural women in other parts of the world, women in agriculture in Manipur are harmed more by the changes in weather, because of less access to support from local governments.

Transportation infrastructure

Tulihal Airport, Changangei, Imphal, the only airport of Manipur, connects directly with Delhi, Kolkata, Guwahati, and Agartala. It has been upgraded to an international airport. As India's second largest airport in the northeast, it serves as a key logistical centre for northeastern states. The Tulihal Airport has been renamed Bir Tikendrajit Airport.

The road network of Manipur, with a length of  connects all the important towns and distant villages. However, the road condition throughout the state is often deplorable. In 2010, Indian government announced that it is considering an Asian infrastructure network from Manipur to Vietnam. The proposed Trans-Asian Railway (TAR), if constructed, will pass through Manipur, connecting India to Burma, Thailand, Malaysia and Singapore.

Tourism

The tourist season is from October to February when it is often sunny without being hot and humid. The culture features martial arts, dance, theatre and sculpture. Greenery accompanies a moderate climate. The seasonal Shirui Lily plant at Ukhrul (district), Dzüko Valley at Senapati, Sangai (Brow antlered deer) and the floating islands at Loktak Lake are among the rarities of the area. Polo, which can be called a royal game, originated in Manipur.

UNESCO list  

The Keibul Lamjao National Park (KLNP), which is the world's only floating national park, located in the Loktak lake, is currently under the tentative lists of the UNESCO World Heritage Sites, under the title "Keibul Lamjao Conservation Area (KLCA)", additionally covering the buffer of Loktak Lake (140 sq km) and Pumlen Pat (43 sq. km), besides the 40 sq km of the KLNP.

The Kangla (officially called the Kangla Fort), which was the historic seat of administration of the Meitei rulers of Manipur Kingdom, is also currently moved in the Indian Parliament, to be included in the UNESCO World Heritage Site list.

Imphal (capital)

The city is inhabited by the Meitei people and other communities. The city contains the Tulihal Airport. The district is divided into East and West. The Khuman Lampak Sports Complex was built for the 1997 National Games. The stadium is used for a sports venue. It also contains a cyclists' velodrome. Most of the imported goods are sold at Paona Bazaar, Gambhir Singh Shopping Complex and Leima Plaza. Kangla Fort, Marjing Polo Statue, Sanamahi Kiyong, Ima Market, Samban-Lei Sekpil, Shree Govindajee Temple, Andro village, and Manipur State Museum are in the city.

Lakes and islands

 from Imphal, lies the largest fresh water lake in northeast India, the Loktak Lake, a miniature inland sea. There is a tourist bungalow atop Sendra Island. Life on the lake includes small islands that are floating weed on which live the lake people, the blue waters of the lake, and colourful water plants. There is a Sendra tourist home with an attached cafeteria in the middle of the lake. Floating islands are made out of the tangle of watery weeds and other plants. The wetland is swampy and is favourable for a number of species. It is in the district of Bishnupur. The etymology of Loktak is "lok = stream / tak = the end" (End of the Streams). Sendra park and resort is opening on the top of Sendra hills and attracting the tourist.

Hills and valleys
It is a sacred place for Manipuri Hindus. The legend is that, Shri Govindajee appeared in the dream of his devotee, Shri Jai Singh Maharaja, and asked the saintly king to install in a temple, an image of Shri Govindajee. It was to be carved out of a jack fruit tree, which was then growing at Kaina. The Dzüko Valley is in Senapati district bordering with Kohima. There are seasonal flowers and number of flora and fauna. The rare Dzüko lily is found only in this valley.

Eco tourism

This ecosystem contains 17 rare species of mammals. It is the only floating national park of the world.
 to the west of Imphal, at the foot of the pine growing hillocks at Iroisemba on the Imphal-Kangchup Road are the Zoological Gardens. Some brow antlered deer (Sangai) are housed there.

Waterfalls
Sadu Chiru waterfall is near Ichum Keirap village  from Imphal, in the Sadar hill area, Senapati district. Agape Park is in the vicinity.

Natural caves
Khangkhui Cave is a natural limestone cave in Ukhrul district. The big hall in the cave is the darbar hall of the Devil King living deep inside while the northern hall is the royal bedroom, according to local folklore. During World War II, villagers sought shelter here. This cave is an hour's trek from Khangkui village.

Education

Manipur schools are run by the state and central government or by private organisation. Instruction is mainly in English. Under the 10+2+3 plan, students may enroll in general or professional degree programs after passing the Higher Secondary Examination (the grade 12 examination). The main universities are Manipur University, Central Agricultural University, National Institute of Technology, Manipur, Indian Institute of Information Technology, Manipur, Jawaharlal Nehru Institute of Medical Sciences, Regional Institute of Medical Sciences and Indira Gandhi National Tribal University.

Manipur is home to India's first floating elementary school: Loktak Elementary Floating School in Loktak Lake.

Transportation

Air
Imphal International Airport is situated in the capital Imphal which connects direct flights from Imphal to Kolkata, Guwahati, New Delhi, Bangalore and Agartala.

Roadways
Manipur is connected to all its neighbouring states with National Highways.

Rail
Currently, Manipur has one operational railway station, Jiribam. Imphal railway station, is an under-construction railway station in Imphal, the capital of Manipur.

Art and Culture

Secular theatre is mostly confined to themes that are not religious; it is performed in the secular or profane spheres. In these are Shumang lila and Phampak lila (stage drama). Shumang lila is very popular. Etymologically Shumang lila is the combination of "Shumang" (courtyard) and "Lila" (play or performance). It is performed in an area of 13×13 ft in the centre of any open space, in a very simple style without a raised stage, set design, or heavy props such as curtains, background scenery, and visual effects. It uses one table and two chairs, kept on one side of the performance space.  Its claim as the "theatre of the masses" is underlined by the way it is performed in the middle of an audience that surrounds it, leaving one passage as entrance and exit.

The world of Phampak lila (stage drama) performed in the proscenium theatre is similar, in form, to the Western theatrical model and Indian Natyasastra model though its contents are indigenous. The so-called modern theatre descended on Manipur theatre culture with the performance of Pravas Milan (1902) under the enthusiastic patronage of Sir Churchand Maharaj (1891–1941). The pace of theatrical movement was geared up with the institution of groups such as Manipur Dramatic Union (MDU) (1930), Arian Theatre (1935), Chitrangada Natya Mandir (1936), Society Theatre (1937), Rupmahal (1942), Cosmopolitan Dramatic Union (1968), and the Chorus Repertory Theatre of Ratan Thiyam (1976). These groups started experimenting with types of plays apart from historical and Puranic ones. Today Manipur theatre is well respected because of excellent productions shown in India and abroad. Manipur plays, both Shumang lila and stage lila, have been a regular feature in the annual festival of the National School of Drama, New Delhi.

Iskcon led by Bhaktisvarupa Damodara Swami started a network of schools in Northeastern India, where more than 4,000 students receive education centred on Vaishnava spiritual values. In 1989 he founded "Ranganiketan Manipuri Cultural Arts Troupe", which has approximately 600 performances at over 300 venues in over 15 countries. Ranganiketan (literally "House of Colorful Arts") is a group of more than 20 dancers, musicians, singers, martial artists, choreographers, and craft artisans. Some of them have received international acclaim.

Manipur dance (Ras Lila)

Manipur dance also known as Jagoi, is one of the major Indian classical dance forms, named after the state of Manipur. It is particularly known for its Hindu Vaishnavism themes, and exquisite performances of love-inspired dance drama of Radha-Krishna called Raslila. However, the dance is also performed to themes related to Shaivism, Shaktism and regional deities such as Umang Lai during Lai Haraoba. The roots of Manipur dance, as with all classical Indian dances, is the ancient Hindu Sanskrit text Natya Shastra, but with influences from the culture fusion between India and Southeast Asia, East Asia, Siberia, Micronesia and Polynesia.

Chorus Repertory Theatre
It has housing and working quarters to accommodate self-sufficiency of life. The theatre association has churned out internationally acclaimed plays like Chakravyuha and Uttarpriyadashi. Its 25 years of existence in theatre had disciplined its performers to a world of excellence. Chakravyuha taken from the Mahabharat epic had won Fringe Firsts Award, 1987 at the Edinburgh International Theater Festival. Chakravyuha deals with the story of Abhimanyu (son of Arjun) of his last battle and approaching death, whereas Uttarpriyadashi is an 80-minute exposition of Emperor Ashoka's redemption.

Sports

Mukna is a popular form of wrestling. Mukna Kangjei, or Khong Kangjei, is a game which combines the arts of mukna (wrestling hockey) and Kangjei (Cane Stick) to play the ball made of seasoned bamboo roots.

Yubi lakpi is a traditional full contact game played in Manipur, India, using a coconut, which has some notable similarities to rugby. Yubi lakpi literally means "coconut snatching". The coconut is greased to make it slippery. There are rules of the game, as with all Manipur sports. The coconut serves the purpose of a ball and is offered to the king, the chief guest or the judges before the game begins. The aim is to run while carrying the greased coconut and physically cross over the goal line, while the other team tackles and blocks any such attempt as well as tries to grab the coconut and score on its own. In Manipur's long history, Yubi lakpi was the annual official game, attended by the king, over the Hindu festival of Shree Govindajee. It is like the game of rugby, or American football.

Oolaobi (Woo-Laobi) is an outdoor game mainly played by females. Meitei mythology believes that UmangLai Heloi-Taret (seven deities–seven fairies) played this game on the Courtyard of the temple of Umang Lai Lairembi. The number of participants is not fixed but are divided into two groups (size as per agreement). Players are divided as into Raiders (Attackers) or Defenders (Avoiders). Hiyang Tannaba, also called Hi Yangba Tanaba, is a traditional boat rowing race and festivity of the Panas.

Polo

Captain Robert Stewart and Lieutenant Joseph Sherer of the British colonial era first watched locals play a rules-based pulu or sagolkangjei (literally, horse and stick) game in 1859. They adopted its rules, calling the game polo, and playing it on their horses. The game spread among the British in Calcutta and then to England.

Apart from these games, some outdoor children's games are fading in popularity. Some games such as Khutlokpi, Phibul Thomba, and Chaphu Thugaibi remain very popular elsewhere, such as in Cambodia. They are played especially during the Khmer New Year.

First of its kind in India, National Sports University will be constructed in Manipur.

Festivals

The festivals of Manipur are Lui-ngai-ni Ningol Chakouba, Shirui Lily festival, Yaoshang, Gan-ngai, Chumpha, Cheiraoba, Kang and Heikru Hidongba, as well as the broader religious festivals Eid-Ul-Fitr, Eid-Ul-Adha and Christmas. Most of these festivals are celebrated on the basis of the lunar calendar. Almost every festival celebrated in other states of India is observed.

On 21 November 2017, the Sangai Festival 2017 was inaugurated by President Ram Nath Kovind in Manipur. Held for 10 days, the festival is named after Manipur's state animal, the brow-antlered Sangai deer. The Sangai Festival showcases the tourism potential of Manipur in the field of arts and culture, handloom, handicrafts, indigenous sports, cuisine, music and adventure sports.

Ningol Chakouba
Held on 9 November, this is a social festival of the Meitei people of Manipur where married women (Ningol) are invited (Chakouba, literally calling to a meal; for dinner or lunch) to a feast at their parental house accompanied by their children. Besides the feast, gifts are given to the women/invitees and to their children. It is the festival that binds and revives the family relations between the women married away and the parental family. Nowadays, other communities have started celebrating this kind of a family-bonding festival.

Kut
Held after the Harvest festival in November, this festival predominantly celebrated by Kuki-Chin-Mizo tribes in Manipur has become one of the leading festivals of the state. Kut is not restricted to a community or tribe — the whole state populace participates in merriment. On 1 November of every year, the state declared holiday for Kut celebration.

Yaosang

Held in February or March, Yaosang is considered to be one of the biggest festivals of Manipur. It is the Holi festival (festival of colour) but Yaosang is the regional name given by the people of Manipur.

Khuado Pawi
Khuado Pawi is the harvest festival of the Tedim people who were recognised as Sukte and Zomi in India and Myanmar respectively. The word Pawi means festival in Tedim Zomi language. It is celebrated every year in the month of September–October after harvesting.

Cheiraoba

Also known as Sajibugi Nongma Panba and held in March or April, Cheiraoba is the new year of Manipur. It is observed on the first lunar day of the lunar month Sajibu (March/April) and so it is also popularly known as Sajibu Cheiraoba. People of Manipur immaculate and decorate their houses and make a sumptuous variety of dishes to feast upon after offering food to the deity on this day. After the feast, as a part of the ritual, people climb hilltops; in the belief that it would excel them to greater heights in their worldly life.

Gaan-Ngai
Gaan-Ngai is the greatest festival of the Zeliangrong people. It is a five-day festival and is usually performed on the 13th day of the Meitei month of Wakching.

Notable people

 

 Saikhom Mirabai Chanu (b 1994) - Indian weightlifter Tokyo Olympics Silver medallist 
 Sushila Chanu - Indian hockey player and former captain of Indian national women's hockey team
 Khwairakpam Chaoba - (1895-1950) - poet 
 Bala Devi - Indian footballer plays as a forward for Rangers W.F.C. and India women's national football team
 Sabitri Heisnam (b 1946) - actress and Padma Shri awardee
 Hijam Irabot (1896-1951) - politician and social activist
 Heisnam Kanhailal - (1941-2016) - theatre director and Padma Bhushan awardee
 Muhammed Alauddin Khan - politician
 Ralengnao Khathing - first and only person from Manipur to serve as an Ambassador for India
 Mary Kom - Only boxer to win 8 amateur world championship medals
 Lin Laishram - International model, actress and entrepreneur
 Dingko Singh - Indian boxer who won the gold medal at 1998 Asian Games
 Irom Chanu Sharmila (b 1972) - civil rights activist and poet
 Armstrong Pame - officer in the Indian Administrative Service
 Jugeshor Singh (b 1990) - Indian footballer
 Laishram Nandakumar Singh - Minister of Urban Development
 Renedy Singh - former Indian footballer
 Udanta Singh - Indian footballer plays as a forward for Bengaluru FC and India national football team

See also 

 2022 in Manipur
 Human rights abuses in Manipur
 List of Manipur films of 2013
 Maramfest
 Outline of Manipur
 Tourist Attractions in Manipur
 Tumukhong
 Kajenglei

Footnotes

References

Bibliography

External links

Government
 
 Official Tourism Site of Manipur

General information
 
 

 
States and union territories of India
Northeast India
States and territories established in 1972
Tourism in Northeast India